Indonesian football clubs have entered Asian association football competitions organized by Asian Football Confederation including AFC Champions League, Asian Cup Winners' Cup, and AFC Cup (Indonesian club has never participated in the competition Asian Super Cup, AFC President's Cup, Afro-Asian Club Championship and AFC Women's Club Championship) since 1970.

PSMS Medan is the first Indonesian club to participate in Asian football competitions, namely 1970 Asian Champion Club Tournament with the result of the fourth place after losing 1–0 to Homenetmen (Lebanon) in the match for third place.

Full Asian record

AFC Champions League/Asian Club championship
 QS : Qualification stage,  GS : Group stage, R16 : Round of 16, QF : Quarterfinals, SF : Semifinals, 4th : Fourth place, 3rd : Third place, RU : Runners-up, W : Winners
1967–1972 : Asian Champion Club tournament
1985–2002 : Asian Club Championship
2002–present : AFC Champions League

Results

Asian Cup Winners' Cup
 R1 : First round, R2 : Second round, QF : Quarter-finals, SF : Semi-finals, RU : Runners-up, W : Winners

Results

AFC Cup
 GS : Group stage, ASF : ASEAN Semi-finals, R16 : Round of 16, AF : ASEAN Final, QF : Quarter-finals, IZSF : Inter-zone Semi-finals, SF : Semi-finals, IZF : Inter-zone Final, RU : Runners-up, W : Winners

Results

See also 
 AFC Champions League
 AFC Cup
 Australian clubs in the AFC Champions League
 Chinese clubs in the AFC Champions League
 Indian football clubs in Asian competitions
 Iranian clubs in the AFC Champions League
 Iraqi clubs in the AFC Champions League
 Japanese clubs in the AFC Champions League
 Myanmar clubs in the AFC Champions League
 Qatari clubs in the AFC Champions League
 Saudi Arabian clubs in the AFC Champions League
 South Korean clubs in the AFC Champions League
 Thai clubs in the AFC Champions League
 Vietnamese clubs in the AFC Champions League

References

Indonesia
Football clubs in the AFC Champions League
Football clubs in the AFC Cup